Carla Macelloni (17 February 1937 – 23 March 2015) was an Italian  actress and television personality.

Life and career
Born in Milan,  Macelloni started acting as a child, on radio dramas and on stage, with the theatrical company "Compagnia di Prosa". Between the second half of the 1950s and the 1960s she appeared in a number of films, as well as on stage and on television, where she also worked as a presenter and a soubrette.

After a hiatus of several decades, she resumed her activities in the 2000s, appearing in some films and the TV-series Butta la luna.

References

External links
 

1931 births
2015 deaths
Actresses from Milan
Italian film actresses
20th-century Italian actresses
Italian stage actresses
Italian television actresses
Italian radio actresses
21st-century Italian actresses